Gate Pa or Gate Pā is a suburb of Tauranga, in the Bay of Plenty Region of New Zealand's North Island.

It is the location of the Battle of Gate Pā in the 1864 Tauranga campaign of the New Zealand Wars.

Demographics

Gate Pa had a population of 4,023 at the 2018 New Zealand census, an increase of 396 people (10.9%) since the 2013 census, and an increase of 480 people (13.5%) since the 2006 census. There were 1,341 households, comprising 2,034 males and 1,989 females, giving a sex ratio of 1.02 males per female. The median age was 31.4 years (compared with 37.4 years nationally), with 903 people (22.4%) aged under 15 years, 1,017 (25.3%) aged 15 to 29, 1,632 (40.6%) aged 30 to 64, and 474 (11.8%) aged 65 or older.

Ethnicities were 67.5% European/Pākehā, 29.5% Māori, 8.0% Pacific peoples, 10.9% Asian, and 2.2% other ethnicities. People may identify with more than one ethnicity.

The percentage of people born overseas was 18.7, compared with 27.1% nationally.

Although some people chose not to answer the census's question about religious affiliation, 49.0% had no religion, 32.1% were Christian, 3.9% had Māori religious beliefs, 1.9% were Hindu, 0.8% were Muslim, 0.4% were Buddhist and 4.0% had other religions.

Of those at least 15 years old, 405 (13.0%) people had a bachelor's or higher degree, and 648 (20.8%) people had no formal qualifications. The median income was $27,300, compared with $31,800 nationally. 192 people (6.2%) earned over $70,000 compared to 17.2% nationally. The employment status of those at least 15 was that 1,590 (51.0%) people were employed full-time, 441 (14.1%) were part-time, and 168 (5.4%) were unemployed.

Economy

The Gate Pa Shopping Centre opened in 2006 and covers 10,000 m². It has 450 carparks and 21 shops, including Mitre 10 Mega and Spotlight.

Education

References

Suburbs of Tauranga
Populated places around the Tauranga Harbour